David Charles Wish (18 July 1942 – 21 October 2016), known as Dave Cash, was a British radio presenter who latterly worked for BBC Radio Kent, having had previous spells at Radio London, BBC Radio 1, Capital London, Radio West (he was launch programme controller at the Bristol station), Invicta Radio, Country 1035 and PrimeTime Radio.

Radio career
Cash was born in Bushey, Hertfordshire, in 1942, and grew up in London. He began his career in broadcasting in Canada; he visited the country while in the British Merchant Navy, and acquired a North American-sounding accent. He returned to the UK in 1964 and joined pirate station Radio London at the age of 21 after meeting up with the programme director, Ben Toney. Toney persuaded him to join the station as the afternoon DJ and writer for commercials, sailing out to the ship in January 1965 as the station's first replacement DJ for the presenters who had been on board for several weeks. Once on board with Radio London, Cash teamed up with Kenny Everett for the Kenny & Cash Show, amongst the most successful of all pirate radio programmes.

After parliament outlawed the pirate stations in 1967, Cash joined Radio Luxembourg, then became one of the first-day DJs on BBC Radio One. Cash's popular Sunday show Cash At Four attracted guests such as Peter Sellers, Spike Milligan, John Cleese, Lady Antonia Fraser, Rolf Harris and David Bellamy.

In 1973, Cash started working at Capital Radio as production manager and presenter. He stayed at Capital for 21 years, reprising the Kenny & Cash Show, hosting a lunchtime quiz competition "Cash on Delivery" (COD) and the weekend programmes for Capital Gold. After the success of his best selling first novel The Rating Game, he left Capital in 1994 to concentrate on his writing.

Cash latterly worked for the BBC, broadcasting his weekend shows on Saturday (vintage charts from the years 1965-1984) and Sunday nights (country and rock and roll) to BBC Radio Kent, BBC Sussex, BBC Surrey, BBC Radio Solent, BBC Radio Berkshire and BBC Radio Oxford.

On 4 December 2011, at Anna Maria Island in the U.S. state of Florida, Cash married Sara Davies (born 1957), they had originally met in 1989, and went on to appear on his BBC radio show where she was called 'Emily Email' and became a co-presenter. They lived in Hollingbourne, Kent.

Film and television
Dave Cash hosted a few episodes of BBC TV series Top of the Pops; however,  only the episode of 15 February 1968 still survives. He co-hosted this edition with Jimmy Savile.  In 1970, Cash wrote and performed The Dave Cash Radio Program, a 26-part sitcom/music show produced at HTV and sold to the ITV network, NBC, and stations across Europe. Guests included Sammy Davis Jr., Richard Harris and Terry-Thomas.

It was on this show that he met his third wife, actress Monica Evans, with whom he had two children.

In 1979, Cash appeared as himself in the cult hit Quadrophenia and took a cameo role alongside Dennis Hopper in The American Way. In 1988, he co-wrote and produced At Last It's Hogmanay with Billy Connolly and Robbie Coltrane for Channel 4.

His last TV appearance was on episode 17 of Sky Art's Trailblazers documentary series (Trailblazers of Pop Radio), originally shown in 2016 and repeated on Freeview in 2021.

Books and articles
In 1991, Cash's first novel The Rating Game made the best-seller charts in four weeks followed in 1993 by All Night Long, and King of Clubs in 1995.

In 2006 he began working on a book designed to be both an autobiography and a history of pirate radio. He was also developing the first ever "triography": a biography written by Cash and his two best friends detailing their road trip to Mexico.

Other work
In 1969 Cash had a minor 'one hit wonder' with Groovy Baby, a top-thirty single novelty record inspired by Cash's broadcasting catchphrase, featuring the voice of a three-year-old, affectionately nicknamed 'Microbe'.

On 9 May 2011, One Media Publishing released a collection of over 1,000 albums compiled by Cash, featuring artists from a diverse range of musical genres, including Toni Braxton, Django Reinhardt, Usher, Aaliyah, The Troggs, Chaka Khan, Elvis Presley, Sham 69, Lou Reed and Jerry Lee Lewis. These albums are currently available via digital music stores only.

Death
Just five days after his final broadcast, Cash died suddenly on 21 October 2016 aged 74, after collapsing at his home. Cash was cremated, and in August 2017 his ashes were scattered by fellow DJ Johnnie Walker off the Harwich coast.

References

External links

1942 births
2016 deaths
British radio personalities
Pirate radio personalities
British radio DJs
Canadian people of English descent
Canadian radio personalities
People from Bushey
Offshore radio broadcasters
BBC Radio 1 presenters
English expatriates in Canada